Constantin "Jean" Barbu (born 16 May 1971) is a Romanian retired professional footballer who played mainly as an attacking midfielder.

Club career
Born in Galaţi, Galați County, Barbu started his professional career with FC Argeş Piteşti, helping it achieve promotion from the second division in 1994 while scoring 89 goals during his seven-season spell (safe for a short spell with South Korea's Suwon Samsung Bluewings).

Midway through 1998–99, Barbu signed with FC Rapid București, helping the capital club to the Liga I title with eight goals in only 11 matches. He was also crowned the competition's top scorer the previous campaign with 21 for Argeş Piteşti, despite missing several games due to his time in Asia.

For 1999–2000, Barbu moved to Spain and joined La Liga strugglers CD Numancia. He netted six times during that season, helping the Soria side barely avoid relegation. During his second year – which he finished with Rapid – he was joined by compatriot Laurenţiu Roşu.

Barbu retired in 2004 after spells with old team Argeş and CS Dacia Mioveni, the last in the second level. With Rapid, he appeared in two UEFA Champions League matches and scored once, adding six appearances in the UEFA Cup (four goals, for Piteşti).

International career
Barbu won three caps for Romania, his first being on 6 September 1997 in an 8–1 1998 FIFA World Cup qualification away trouncing of Liechtenstein, in which he scored.

He also netted in his last, against Greece.

International stats

International goals
Scores and results list Romania's goal tally first, score column indicates score after each Barbu goal.

Personal life
Constantin Barbu is the father of footballer Cătălin Barbu who also started his career at FC Argeș Pitești.

Honours
Dacia Pitești
Divizia C: 1991–92

Argeș Pitești
Divizia B: 1993–94

Rapid București
Divizia A: 1998–99
Cupa României runner-up: 1998–99
Supercupa României: 1999

Individual
Divizia A top scorer: 1997–98 (21 goals)

References

External links

1971 births
Living people
Romanian footballers
Romania international footballers
Association football midfielders
Liga I players
Liga II players
FC Dacia Pitești players
FC Argeș Pitești players
FC Rapid București players
CS Mioveni players
K League 1 players
Suwon Samsung Bluewings players
La Liga players
Segunda División players
CD Numancia players
Romanian expatriate footballers
Expatriate footballers in South Korea
Expatriate footballers in Spain
Romanian expatriate sportspeople in South Korea
Romanian expatriate sportspeople in Spain
Sportspeople from Galați